The Metz family is a family in Luxembourg that was prominent in politics and industry in the mid- and late nineteenth century and early twentieth century.  The head of the household was Jean Metz, who had nine children.  This second generation included Auguste Metz, Charles Metz, and Norbert Metz, who were all leading liberal politicians during the early stages of Luxembourg's independence, in the mid-nineteenth century.  These three brothers defined political and economic life in Luxembourg in the mid-nineteenth century, and their children included further political and industrial leaders.

The Metz family also inter-married with other famous and powerful Luxembourgian families, including the Le Gallais, Vannérus, Laval, and Laeis families.

Family tree

Below is a partial family tree, showing some of the most prominent family members.  People have the surname Metz unless stated otherwise.

Footnotes

References